Augaire mac Ailella (with similar spellings like Ugaire and Aililla) was the King of Laigin (Leinster), Ireland, who is said to have led the Irish forces at the Battle of Confey c. 915-917. The Irish were defeated by Vikings under King Sigtrygg Caech (also called Sigtrygg Gael or Sithric the Blind) from Dublin. The Annals of the Four Masters said he was killed in the battle. The warrior who actually slew Ugaire in 917 was the father of Palnatoke, who in the Jómsvíkinga saga is named Palner Tokesen (Pálnir son of Tóki) but in the Gesta Wulinensis ecclesiae pontificum is named Palmairslau. Regardless of his correct name he came from the island of Funen.

He was probably the husband of Mór ingen Cearbhaill from the neighboring kingdom of Osraige.

See also
Early Medieval Ireland 800–1166
Kings of Leinster
Leixlip
History of Ireland

References

Sources
Annals of the Four Masters translation

Kings of Leinster
Kings of Uí Dúnlainge
917 deaths
9th-century births
10th-century Irish monarchs
People from County Kildare
10th-century kings of Leinster
Monarchs killed in action